The Shire of Merredin is a local government area in the Wheatbelt region of Western Australia, about  east of Perth, the state capital. Its seat of government is the town of Merredin, where 2,804 of the Shire's 3,595 residents live.

History
On 30 June 1921, the Merredin Road District was created. On 1 July 1961, it became a shire under the Local Government Act 1960.

Wards
On 3 May 2003, all wards were abolished and all 11 councillors sit at large.

Prior to this, the ward structure was as follows:
 Central Ward (7 councillors)
 North West Ward
 North East Ward
 South West Ward
 Totadgin Ward

Towns and localities
The towns and localities of the Shire of Merredin with population and size figures based on the most recent Australian census:

Population

Notable councillors
 William Telfer, Merredin Roads Board member 1936–1955, chairman 1938–1955; also a state MP

Heritage-listed places

As of 2023, 99 places are heritage-listed in the Shire of Merredin, of which 15 are on the State Register of Heritage Places.

References

External links

 

 
Merredin